Mungret is a village and civil parish in County Limerick, Ireland. It is located close to Limerick City on the N69 national secondary road. As of the 2016 census, the village had a population of 277 people.

The local church, which is dedicated to Saint Oliver Plunkett, was built in 1981; and is in the parish of Mungret, Crecora and Raheen within the Roman Catholic Diocese of Limerick. The local Gaelic Athletic Association club is Mungret St. Pauls GAA.

Places of interest

Close to the abbey is Mungret College, a (former) Jesuit secondary school.

See also
 List of towns and villages in County Limerick

References

Towns and villages in County Limerick
Civil parishes of County Limerick